Vision system may refer to:
 Visual system, the neurobiological circuitry and processing that enable living beings to see
 Machine vision, a computer-based system where software performs tasks assimilable to "seeing", usually aimed to industrial quality assurance, part selection, defect detection etc.
 Computer vision, an interdisciplinary study that deals with how computers can gain high-level understanding from digital images or videos